Informe Robinson is a monthly Spanish sports magazine programme broadcast on #0 and formerly on Canal+. It is hosted by former Republic of Ireland international football player Michael Robinson.

Awards
 Premios Onda 2009: Best current affairs programme

References

External links
Informe Robinson at canalplus.es

2000s Spanish television series
2007 Spanish television series debuts